Stan Gruszynski (born February 6, 1949) is a former Democratic member of the Wisconsin State Assembly representing the 71st district.  He served five terms as State Representative from 1984 to 1994. He served as a member of the Democratic National Committee and, therefore, a superdelegate to the 2008 Democratic National Convention.  He endorsed Barack Obama in the 2008 United States Presidential Election. In June, 2008, Gruszynski announced he would seek the Democratic nomination for the 36th district of the Wisconsin State Assembly.

Early life

Gruszynski was born in Marinette, Wisconsin.  He graduated from Northland College, with a bachelor's degree in sociology and political science, and pursued graduate studies at the University of Wisconsin–Stevens Point.

Assembly career

As a member of the State Assembly, Gruszynski authored the Wisconsin Environmental Education Law, Farms for the Future Act, and served as chairman of the Assembly's Colleges and Universities Committee.

Later elections

In 1994, Gruszynski decided against seeking reelection, and instead ran unsuccessfully for United States House of Representatives from Wisconsin's 8th congressional district losing to the incumbent, Toby Roth.  Gruszynski again ran for the House of Representatives in 1996, but failed to receive the nomination of the Democratic Party, losing to Jay W. Johnson, who would go on to win the seat.

Later career

Gruszynski formerly served as the director of the Global Environmental Management (GEM) Rural Leadership and Community Development Program at the University of Wisconsin–Stevens Point. In 2009 he was appointed by the Obama Administration to be the Wisconsin State Director of U.S.D.A. Rural Development.

He lives in Porterfield, Wisconsin.

References

1949 births
Living people
People from Marinette, Wisconsin
Democratic Party members of the Wisconsin State Assembly
Northland College (Wisconsin) alumni
University of Wisconsin–Stevens Point alumni